Taxiarchis Fountas (born 4 September 1995) is a Greek professional footballer who plays as a forward for Major League Soccer club D.C. United and the Greece national team.

After beginning his career at AEK Athens, he went on to play in the Austrian Bundesliga with Grödig, St. Pölten and Austria Wien, while also being on the books of Red Bull Salzburg. He also played in Super League Greece for Panionios and Asteras Tripolis.

Fountas made his senior international debut for Greece in 2015.

Club career

AEK Athens
Taxiarchis Fountas was scouted by Toni Savevski, the head of AEK Athens' youth academy at the time. On 17 March 2012. Fountas made his senior debut for AEK Athens against Asteras Tripolis being the youngest player to play for AEK Athens in a Superleague game aged 16 years 6 months and 13 days old. He played 31 minutes in this game. He made his first start for the club on 22 April on the final day of the 2011–12 regular season against Doxa Drama, completing the whole 90 minutes.

Fountas scored his first goal for the club in a 1–0 win against Platanias on 28 October 2012, thus becoming the youngest player to score for AEK at the age of 17 years and 54 days. He scored another goal against Veria on 18 October 2012 and another one against PAS Giannina on 3 November 2012. He was also awarded the MVP award after this match. He scored his 4th goal again against Veria on 16 March 2013 with a fine left foot shoot. When the club was relegated, the player was released. He also scored a snipe against Everton in a friendly match in the summer of 2012.

Red Bull Salzburg
In June Fountas was linked with a move to Red Bull Salzburg. A potential transfer was complicated by the financial problems of Fountas' club AEK Athens which was on the verge of financial collapse. In September 2013, he joined the club on a four-year contract. After the signing of his contract, Fountas joined FC Liefering of the Austrian Football First League on a six-month loan.

In January 2014, Fountas moved on loan to SV Grödig until end of season. He made his first appearance in the Austrian Bundesliga a week later.

At the beginning of the 2014–15 season, Fountas moved on loan to Panionios, returning to the Greek Superleague.

After Fountas' exceptional season with Panionios, he was loaned to Asteras Tripolis.  On 2 January 2016, he scored his first goal with the club to a 4–0 home win against Panthrakikos. On 5 January 2015, few days after his first goal with his club in the Greek Superleague, he scored a goal in a 3–0 away win against AEL for Greek Cup.

Panionios
On 21 July 2016, Fountas, who had been released from Asteras Tripolis, signed a one (plus one) year contract and officially returned to Panionios. On 1 July 2017, under mutual agreement Panionios solved the player's contract.

Sonnenhof Großaspach
On 20 September 2017, as a free agent, Fountas signed a with German club 3. Liga club SG Sonnenhof Großaspach. He was signed by their Greek sporting director, Yiannis Koukoutrigas.

St. Pölten
On 14 July 2018, after a year in Germany, Fountas signed a long season contract, with Austrian club St. Pölten. He scored four goals in 21 games in his only season.

Rapid Wien

On 9 May 2019, Fountas signed a deal with Austrian club Rapid Wien through the summer of 2022, with his St Polten contract due to expire. On 4 August, he scored his first goal for the club in a 2–2 away draw against his previous club and a week later he scored a brace against SC Rheindorf Altach, contributing to his team's first win of the season. On 29 September, in a 3–3 home draw against TSV Hartberg, he scored another brace. On 15 December, he scored his third brace of the season, sealing a 3–0 away win against Admira Wacker, which included him in the Team of the Week in the Austrian Bundesliga for matchday 18. Fountas led the club's scoring with 11 goals from 15 matches.

On 3 February 2020, Rapid Wien's fans named Fountas as the best player of 2019. On 1 July, he scored in his fifth game in a row, a 3–1 home win against LASK. He finished the 2019–20 Austrian Football Bundesliga campaign with 19 goals, to help his club earn a berth in the UEFA Champions League qualifiers. He was the third-highest scorer in the league, trailing only Patson Daka (24 goals, RB Salzburg) and Shon Weissman (30 goals, Wolfsberger).

On 30 August 2020, in his first official game for the 2020–21 season, he scored a hat trick in a 5–0 Austrian Cup win against TSV St. Johann. On 11 September 2020, Fountas helped his club to win Admira by scoring a brace at the 2020–21 Austrian Football Bundesliga opener. He scored again during a 2–1 defeat to Arsenal in the Europa League Group stage on 22 October, capitalising on an error by goalkeeper Bernd Leno to put the ball in the net.

On 18 January 2021, Fountas spat at Lukas Malicsek in the friendly match between his club and Admira, with the Austrian Bundesliga punishing him for four games. On 4 April, he scored a hat-trick in his team's 8–1 away win against Wolfsberger AC.

On 8 August 2021, Fountas scored in the first half and with two quickfire second half goals in a 3–0 home win against Wolfsberger AC; later in the month he netted in both legs of a 2021–22 UEFA Europa League playoffs tie against FC Zorya Luhansk in a 6–2 aggregate win over the Ukrainian side.

D.C. United
On 25 January 2022, according to a report in The Washington Post, Fountas agreed a three-year contract with MLS club D.C. United and will become its highest paid player with a reported contract worth a total of $7 million. He was initially not expected to arrive from Rapid Vienna until summer 2022, when his contract expired. On 21 March, it was announced that he would join D.C. United ahead of the summer.

Fountas made his debut for D.C. United on 16 April, in a 2–3 loss against Austin FC. In his second game and first start for the club, he scored two and assisted a further goal in a 3–2 win over the New England Revolution. On 4 July, he scored a hat-trick in a 5–3 win at Orlando City SC.

During a match between DC United and Inter Miami on 18 September 2022, Fountas was accused of racially abusing defender Damion Lowe by calling him the n-word. He was later substituted, while MLS opened an official investigation into the incident. Inter Miami coach Phil Neville commented on the incident: "It was a racist comment. It was unacceptable. A word was used. I think it's unacceptable in society. A word was used, I think, the worst word in the world. And that's it, really." Fountas denies the allegation. MLS ultimately decided that the accusation by a Miami player who claimed to have heard Fountas saying something to Lowe (who apparently did not hear the comment himself) was "credible" but that it could not be verified.

International career
Fountas made his international debut for Greece on 13 June 2015, in a UEFA Euro 2016 qualifier away to the Faroe Islands. In the 2– loss, he came on in the 81st minute for Panagiotis Kone.

Fountas went uncapped for almost exactly five years from September 2015 to 2020. He scored his first international goal on 17 November 2022, coming on for Dimitrios Pelkas and equalising in added time at the end of a 2–2 draw away to Malta.

Career statistics

Club

International

Honours
Red Bull Salzburg
Austrian Bundesliga: 2013–14
Austrian Cup: 2013–14

Individual
Austrian Bundesliga Team of the Year: 2019–20
Rapid Wien Best Player Award: 2019
MLS All-Star: 2022

References

External links

Living people
1995 births
People from Missolonghi
Greek footballers
Association football midfielders
Greece international footballers
Greece under-21 international footballers
Greece youth international footballers
Super League Greece players
2. Liga (Austria) players
Austrian Football Bundesliga players
3. Liga players
SV Grödig players
AEK Athens F.C. players
Asteras Tripolis F.C. players
Panionios F.C. players
FC Red Bull Salzburg players
FC Liefering players
SG Sonnenhof Großaspach players
SKN St. Pölten players
D.C. United players
Designated Players (MLS)
Greek expatriate footballers
Greek expatriate sportspeople in Austria
Expatriate footballers in Austria
Greek expatriate sportspeople in Germany
Expatriate footballers in Germany
Major League Soccer players
Footballers from Western Greece